The 1997–98 Nemzeti Bajnokság I, also known as NB I, was the 96th season of top-tier football in Hungary. The league was officially named Raab–Karcher NB1 for sponsoring reasons. The season started on 18 July 1997 and ended on 6 June 1998.

Overview
It was contested by 18 teams, and Újpesti TE won the championship.

League standings

Results

Relegation play-offs 

|}

Statistical leaders

Top goalscorers

External links
 RSSSF link

Nemzeti Bajnokság I seasons
1
Hun